The Kehek (or Qeheq) were a minor Ancient Libyan group that battled with the Egyptians during the New Kingdom of Egypt. It is also believed that this might be an ancient city whose location is unknown. They are mentioned in Papyrus Anastasi I as part of Egyptian troops in theoretical invasion to Djahy along with Sherden, Meswesh, Nubians and Egyptian archers. They were also employed as an auxiliary foreign corps in Egypt after their defeat to Ramses III, in Memphis in 1188 B.C.

Amenhotep I's efforts to expand the Egyptian borders faced him with an enemy named Kehek or Qeheq.

References

Wars involving ancient Egypt

Berber peoples and tribes